Act of Memory is a 12-minute short film written and directed by Jack Ryder and produced by David Pugh, Dafydd Rogers and Laura Crampsie. The film stars Claire Skinner, Owen Teale, Anna Massey, and introduces Grace Cooper Milton as Maria.  It was shot on location in Southwark, London in December 2010.

Synopsis
When the holidays evoke a young girl's memories of her father, she is forced to choose between either continuing to run from them or embracing the spirit of Christmas. The film is set in England at Christmas in 1948 and is based upon the award-winning short story by Mary Grace Dembeck.

Festivals and awards
Official Selection - Garden State Film Festival, 2012
Official Selection - Mrytle Beach International Film Festival, 2012
Official Selection - Newport Beach Film Festival, 2012
Cannes Film Festival, Short Film Corner, 2012
Official Selection - 2012 Flickers Rhode Island International Film Festival

References

External links
 

2012 films
British short films